is a train station on the  Keihan Electric Railway Keihan Main Line in Sekime Gochome, Joto-ku, Osaka, Japan.

Lines
Keihan Electric Railway Keihan Main Line
Osaka Metro Imazatosuji Line (Sekime-Seiiku Station)

Layout
2 side platforms serving a track each are located on the 2nd level, outside of 2 inner tracks.

Adjacent stations

Jōtō-ku, Osaka
Railway stations in Osaka
Railway stations in Japan opened in 1931